is an extreme trans-Neptunian object from the scattered disc on a highly eccentric orbit in the outermost region of the Solar System. It was discovered on 5 March 2019, by American astronomers Scott Sheppard, David Tholen, and Chad Trujillo at Mauna Kea Observatories in Hawaii, and announced on 17 December 2021. It was 83.4 astronomical units from the Sun when it was discovered, making it one of the most distant known Solar System objects from the Sun . It has been identified in precovery images from 6 January 2016.

References

External links 
 
 

Minor planet object articles (unnumbered)

20190305